The Battle of Northam was fought in Northam, Devon in 1069 between a Norman force led by Brian of Brittany and an Anglo Saxon army commanded by Godwin and Edmund, two sons of the late English king Harold Godwinson. The Normans inflicted heavy casualties on the Saxons and forced them to retreat from Devon.

Background 
English King Harold Godwinson was defeated and killed in the Battle of Hastings by the Norman William the Conqueror, who subsequently took control of most of southern England. However much of the west and north remained only nominally in or completely out of William’s control. This allowed many members of Harold’s family to continue operating with power, such as his mother Gytha and his sons by Edith, his unofficial wife, who were called Godwin, Edmund and Magnus.

Prelude 
In January 1068 King William personally led an army to besiege Exeter, the biggest city in Devon, which was Gytha’s main power base. After an 18-day siege the city surrendered and Gytha fled.

Godwin, Edmund and Magnus, who were likely at the siege, fled to Ireland to seek help from Diarmait, the High King of Ireland. Diarmait had previously helped their father, in 1052. Diarmat gave the brothers a fleet of 52 ships and a small army to resist the Normans and they returned to Devon and began raiding. By now William had gone, but he had left a large force to garrison the area, led by Eadnoth the Staller, who engaged the brothers at the Battle of Bleadon. The exact outcome of the battle is unknown, but Eadnoth was killed, and the Saxons retreated to their ships. Magnus is not mentioned after this battle, so he may have died as well. The battle must not have been decisive, since the Saxons continued to raid the coast of Devon and Cornwall with their fleet, before eventually returning to Ireland. Here Diarmat supplied them with more forces, bolstering their number to 64 ships and a large enough force to fully challenge the Normans in the southwest.

Battle 
In June 1069 the brothers returned with their army, landing at Appledore, a small village on the north Devon coast. They advanced to Northam and began raiding the area. The Norman army, now under command of the king’s second cousin, Brian of Brittany, and the noble William De Vauville, quickly arrived in the area and attacked the Saxons. The size of both armies is unknown, but estimated at a few thousand each. The Normans however had superior troops, with Brian commanding a large force of Breton knights.

The scattered raiders were quickly pushed back to Appledore, where they joined up with the rest of their army. However, they found their ships stranded, as the tide had moved out. The Saxons had already suffered casualties and still faced the Norman knights.

For many hours the Normans launched repeated attacks against the Anglo-Saxon shield wall, in almost exactly the same way the early stages of the Battle of Hastings had played out. The Saxon line never broke, but they took heavy casualties. As night came, the tide finally returned, and the Saxons escaped to sea, ending the battle.

Aftermath 
The Saxons had taken 1,700 casualties, possibly more than half their army, and so were unable to continue their campaign. The brothers returned to Ireland, where Diarmat told them he either could not or would not supply them with more forces. The brothers moved on to Denmark, possibly hoping to receive new help from King Sweyn II Estridsson. However that help clearly must not have come, since the brothers soon disappeared from history. Thus, the Battle of Northam marks the end of the attempts of Harold’s successors to reclaim the throne of England.

References 

1069 in England
History of Devon
Norman conquest of England
Torridge District
11th-century conflicts
Invasions of England